Idahor is a surname. Notable people with the surname include:

Endurance Idahor (1984–2010), Nigerian footballer
Lucky Idahor (born 1980), Nigerian footballer
 

Surnames of Nigerian origin